Mae Valley was a New Zealand country music duo consisting of Abby Christodoulou and Hannah Cosgrove. The duo was formed on the second series of the New Zealand version of The X Factor and were managed by SMOKE.

Discography

Extended plays

Singles

References

Musical groups established in 2015
Country pop duos
New Zealand country music groups
2015 establishments in New Zealand